Euphemites is an extinct genus of gastropod belonging to order Bellerophontida and family Euphemitidae. They may have been among the first burrowing gastropods.

Species 
E. blaneanus McChesney
E. inspeciosus White
E. nodocarinatus Hall
E. vittatus McChesney

References 

Paleozoic molluscs
Gastropods
Bellerophontidae